ABC Kids is the Australian Broadcasting Corporation's part-time channel, broadcasting shows between the hours of 5am and 7:30pm for children 7 years old and younger in each local Australian channel.  It shares the same bandwidth as ABC TV Plus which broadcasts outside ABC Kids' scheduled hours and supplements the flagship ABC TV channel with extra adult-oriented programming. It has an educational program for children ages 2 to 13 called "ABC Reading Eggs" for Australia, internationally called "Reading Eggs" and owned by Edmentum.

History

Origins

In 1991, all children's programming on the ABC was organized into a daily broadcasting block under the name ABC For Kids. This new programming block featured a range of programming ranging from preschoolers to young children and included both old and new content. The logo featured six blocks (3 across, 2 down) with the top row lettered "A", "B" and "C", and the bottom row featuring an apple, a bee and a carrot beneath their respective letter.

2001–2009

In 2001, the ABC For Kids timeslot was rebranded as ABC Kids and content was expanded to include shows for older children as well as younger children. A new logo was also introduced, featuring a solid green Lissajous curve (taken from the ABC's logo) overlaid with "ABC Kids" in lowercase blue letters.

2001–2003: ABC Kids and Fly TV channels
In addition to the daily broadcasting block on the ABC, a new children's channel with the ABC Kids branding commenced transmission nationally on 1 August 2001 on channel 21, becoming ABC Television's first digital multichannel service. The service was officially inaugurated by former ABC Managing Director, Jonathan Shier, at the Australian Parliament House in Canberra on 7 August 2001. The ABC launched the channel without additional funding, hoping that its success would prompt an additional government grant. ABC Kids was broadcast from 6:00am to 6:00pm, with the remaining broadcasting time occupied by its sister service, Fly TV.

Fly TV was launched on 1 November 2001 to feature programming aimed at teenagers and young adults and broadcast a 6-hour block from 6:00pm to 12:00am, which was repeated from 12:00am to 6:00am. In addition to their availability on free-to-air television, the ABC Kids and Fly TV channels were also available on Austar channel 14 and Optus TV channel 21.

The ABC Kids and Fly TV channels were discontinued on 30 June 2003 in the first of a series of cuts to save around A$25 million a year for the ABC. The ABC could not secure government funding to keep the channel on-air, and the sluggish uptake of digital television in Australia at the time made justifying a digital-only channel with a low viewership against the cost of keeping the channel on-air difficult. However, the ABC Kids brand still remained throughout this period on the ABC's daily children's broadcasting block.

After the close of the ABC Kids and Fly TV channels, programming for younger Fly TV viewers was integrated into the ABC Kids broadcasting block.

2009–2011: Split between two channels

In 2009, two daily blocks of children's programming were launched as ABC For Kids, running from 8:00am to 11:00am and 2:55pm to 4:00pm on ABC1. From 2 May 2009, a new preschool children's block, ABC For Kids On 2 was launched on ABC2 in 2009–2011, featuring children's programming every day until 6pm, because of this ABC For Kids was renamed ABC1 For Kids. Some ABC2 programmes had to be cancelled or relocated to other channels, such as Rage. The classic ABC For Kids logo from 1991 was rendered in 3D when the ABC for Kids name was revived.

2011–present: Part-time channel refocus 
In 2011, all children's programming was moved from the main ABC channel and was divided between ABC 4 Kids and ABC3. ABC for Kids on 2 rebranded as ABC 4 Kids and was refocused as a part-time channel for preschoolers sharing the same bandwidth of ABC2 between 6am and 7pm. A new logo based on the ABC3 logo was also introduced.

Broadcasting of the channel was rescheduled to begin at 5am instead of 6am on 7 July 2014.

On 2 March 2015, the name of the channel was changed to ABC Kids and a new logo inspired by the classic children's logo was unveiled.

Within the rebrand of ABC Comedy on 4 December 2017, broadcasting of the channel was rescheduled to end at 7:30pm instead of 7pm.

On 1 October 2018, ABC Kids first aired the Logie award-winning animated preschool television series Bluey. 

The channel again received a new logo and look on 17 March 2020, introducing three animated characters based on the classic logo (an apple, a bee and a crocodile named Croc, instead of a carrot). The rebrand was designed by ABC Made, the ABC's in-house award-winning creative team.

Broadcasting of the channel was rescheduled to end at 6:30pm instead of 7:30pm on 1 January 2023. 

Broadcasting of the channel was rescheduled to end at 7pm instead of 6:30pm on 6 February 2023, due to audience feedback. 

Broadcasting of the channel was rescheduled back to end at 7:30pm instead of 7pm on 13 February 2023, due to complaints.

Programming

See also

Children's programming on ABC Television
List of digital television channels in Australia

References

External links

Australian Broadcasting Corporation television
Television programming blocks in Australia
Digital terrestrial television in Australia
Television channels and stations established in 2011
English-language television stations in Australia
Commercial-free television networks in Australia
Children's television networks
Children's television channels in Australia
2011 establishments in Australia
Preschool education television networks